Grand Lake is a large lake in the interior of the island of Newfoundland, in the Canadian province of Newfoundland and Labrador. Contained within the lake is the 18th largest lake-island in the world, Glover Island.

History 
The lake was flooded in 1924 with the construction of the Main Dam on Junction Brook, adding approximately 11 meters to the original lake depth. This elevation increase combined Grand Lake with Sandy Lake and Birchy Lake. With this, the lake also engulfed several smaller interconnected ponds and rivers such as Sandy Lake River (Main Brook).

Geography 
Today, the lake's surface elevation varies between 84 and 87.7 meters; it is highest immediately following snow melt in the spring and lowest just before the spring melt begins. It is located on the west side of Newfoundland, 24 km southeast of the city of Corner Brook. Fed by numerous small streams and brooks, it drains into Deer Lake via the 12 km long Humber Canal, and then via the Humber River, into the Bay of Islands. The lake contains the uninhabited Glover Island (178 km2). Together with its feeder lakes, Sandy and Birchy, Grand Lake forms a waterway much used by recreational boaters.

Usage 
The lake serves as a reservoir for the hydro-electric generating station at Deer Lake, which was constructed to provide electricity to the pulp and paper mill at Corner Brook.

See also
 List of lakes of Newfoundland and Labrador
 Glover Island

References

Lakes of Newfoundland and Labrador